Heinrich Karl Maria Graf von Clam-Martinic (1 January 1863 in Vienna – 7 March 1932 in Klam) was an Austrian statesman. He was one of the last Prime Ministers in the Austrian half of the Austro-Hungarian empire, he was called during World War I to head a new cabinet by Emperor Charles on 13 December 1916, soon after the death of Emperor Franz Joseph on 21 November 1916.  As Prime Minister, he replaced Ernest von Koerber, but his government only lasted until 30 May 1917. He was succeeded by Ernst Seidler von Feuchtenegg (1917-1918), Baron Max Hussarek von Heinlein (1918), and Heinrich Lammasch (1918).

His short-lived cabinet included well known contemporary Austrian figures such as Karl Urban and Joseph Baernreither. On 10 July 1917 Clam became, until the end of the war, Military Governor of occupied Montenegro, as successor of Viktor Weber Edler von Webenau. On 21 February 1918 the Emperor named him Knight in the Order of the Golden Fleece. He was a member of the Clam-Martinic family.

See also 
 Portrait

References

 Ottův slovník naučný nové doby

External links
Heiko Brendel: Clam-Martinic, Heinrich, Graf, in: 1914-1918-online. International Encyclopedia of the First World War.

1863 births
1932 deaths
20th-century Ministers-President of Austria
Counts of Austria
Politicians from Vienna
Ministers-President of Austria
Knights of the Golden Fleece of Austria
Members of the House of Lords (Austria)